The 2nd constituency of Borsod-Abaúj-Zemplén County is one of the single member constituencies of the National Assembly, the national legislature of Hungary. The constituency standard abbreviation: Borsod-Abaúj-Zemplén 02. OEVK.

Since 2022, it has been represented by János Kiss of the Fidesz–KDNP party alliance.

Geography
The 2nd constituency is located in western part of Borsod-Abaúj-Zemplén County.

List of municipalities
The constituency includes the following municipalities:

Members
The constituency was first represented by László Varga of MSZP (with Unity support) from 2014 to 2018. In the 2018 election György Hubay of the Fidesz was elected representative. He was succeeded by János Kiss of the Fidesz in 2022.

Notes

References

Borsod-Abauj-Zemplen 2nd